Events from the year 1844 in China.

Incumbents 
 Daoguang Emperor (24th year)

Viceroys
 Viceroy of Zhili — Nergingge
 Viceroy of Min-Zhe — 
 Viceroy of Huguang — 
 Viceroy of Shaan-Gan — ?
 Viceroy of Liangguang — 
 Viceroy of Yun-Gui — 
 Viceroy of Sichuan — 
 Viceroy of Liangjiang —

Events 
 3 July — Treaty of Wanghia signed by the Great Qing Empire and the United States at the Kun Iam Temple in Macau, Portuguese Macau
 The Chinese Union, an early Chinese Protestant Christian missionary society that was  involved in preaching to Chinese and sending Chinese workers to Mainland China  during the late Qing Dynasty was founded by Karl Gützlaff in 1844, Hong Kong
 Renji Hospital, the first western hospital in Shanghai, established
 Mary Ann Aldersey, an eccentric British woman, who opens a school for girls in Ningpo

References